Roy Joel Cicala (March 28, 1939 – January 22, 2014) was an American producer, engineer, songwriter and musician. His body of work includes over 10 Platinum Records for producing, writing, engineering and management for talent from the 1970s through to 2014.

Biography
Roy Cicala was born Roy Joel Cicala in New Haven, Connecticut. Since his 1968 start at Record Plant Studios in New York, he recorded and produced some of the greatest artists of modern music, including Cab Calloway, John Lennon, Aretha Franklin, Four Seasons, Madonna, Elvis Presley, Elton John, Bruce Springsteen, Sting, Frank Sinatra, Dire Straits, Jimi Hendrix, David Bowie, Harry Nilsson, Miles Davis, Chick Corea, Ray Charles, Queen, Aerosmith, Bon Jovi, Liza Minnelli, Roberta Flack, Patti La Belle, Van Morrison, Don McLean, The Who, Johnny Winter, Crosby, Stills, Nash and Young, Frank Zappa, Lou Reed, Prince, Santana, Sarah Vaughan, Charles Mingus and many others.

Cicala began working freelance engineering jobs in New York when he took over Record Plant Studios piloting mega-albums hits as chief engineer. He was an engineer on the first album ever recorded at Record Plant Studios, Electric Ladyland by The Jimi Hendrix Experience, released in 1968. Through the years, he worked on hundreds of albums. During the 1970s, house engineers Shelly Yakus and Roy Cicala gave many local bands their start by donating session time and materials to upcoming artists, engineering and producing their demo tapes. While at Record Plant, Cicala was involved with a wide range of projects, including doing the remote work for the "Live Aid" concert in 1985. Record Plant closed in 1989.

Cicala first worked with John Lennon just before The Beatles broke up in 1970. Cicala did engineering work for Lennon and Ono on various albums, including Imagine, Mind Games and Double Fantasy.

Works
Selected engineering, production and Record Plant NYC credits
The Jimi Hendrix Experience: Electric Ladyland – 1967-68
Frank Sinatra: Watertown - 1969
Four Seasons: "Genuine Imitation Life Gazette" - 1969
John Lennon: Imagine – 1971
John Lennon & Yoko Ono: Sometime in New York City - 1972
John Lennon: Mind Games - 1973
John Lennon: Walls and Bridges -1974
Aerosmith: Get Your Wings – 1973-74
Bruce Springsteen: Born to Run – 1974-75
Aerosmith: Toys in the Attic – 1975
John Lennon: Rock and Roll - 1975
Bruce Springsteen: Darkness on the Edge of Town – 1977-78
Patti Smith Group: Easter – 1978
David Bowie: Lodger – 1979
Jerome T. Youngman & Hooks: Young and Boring – 1980
John Lennon & Yoko Ono: Double Fantasy - 1980
AC/DC: Who Made Who - 1986
Patti Smith: Peace and Noise - 1997
Forgotten Boys: Louva-a-Deus – 2007
Garland Jeffreys: The King of In Between – 2011
Optic Yellow Felt:Optic Yellow Felt - 2011
The Moondogs: "Black & White Woman" - 2013

Selected live engineering, production and Record Plant Remote credits
 George Harrison & Friends, Concert for Bangladesh, Madison Square Garden - August 1, 1971
 Elton John, Concert on the Great Lawn in Central Park in New York City - September 13, 1980
 Live Aid - a multi-venue rock music concert. July 13, 1985.

Selected songwriting credits
 John Lennon: Incantation - 1974

Other credits
 John Lennon: Walls and Bridges: Strings and Remixing
 Johnny Rivers: "Secret Agent Man" - Theme to the American Broadcast of the British series Danger Man.

Cicala had been working in Brazil since the 1970s in various engineering and production capacities. He was producing and managing major label artists like Charlie Brown Jr. at the newly launched Record Plant South. He sat on the advisory board for a New York City-based start-up founded by his nephew Craig Alberino.

References

 John Blaney, John Lennon, Paul McCartney, Lennon and McCartney - Together Alone: A Critical Discography of Their Solo Work (Paperback), Jawbone Press (March 28, 2007). , 
 Richard, Burgess, The Art Of Music Production (Paperback), Omnibus Press; 3rd edition (May 1, 2005), 
 Maureen Droney, Mix Masters: Platinum Engineers Reveal Their Secrets for Success (Paperback), Berklee Press; Pap/Com edition (January 1, 2003). , 
 Mark Cunningham, Good Vibrations: A History of Record Production (Sanctuary Music Library) (Paperback), Alan Parson (Introduction), Brian Eno (Introduction) Sanctuary Publishing, Ltd; 2 edition (September 1, 1999). , 
 David Simons, Studio Stories: How the Great New York Records Were Made: From Miles to Madonna, Sinatra to the Ramones (Paperback), Backbeat Books (November 19, 2004). , 
 Albert Goldman, The Lives of John Lennon (Paperback), Chicago Review Press; New Ed edition (September 1, 2001) # Language: English # , 
 Billy James, A Dream Goes on Forever: The Continuing Story of Todd Rundgren (Paperback), Golden Treasures Pub (December 2002). , 
 Bruce Spizer, The Beatles Solo on Apple Records (Hardcover), Allan Steckler (Foreword), Four Ninety-Eight Productions (April 30, 2005). , 
 Richard Williams, Phil Spector: Out Of His Head (Paperback), Omnibus Press; Revised edition (August 1, 2003). , 
 Michael J. Hockinson, The Ultimate Beatles Quiz Book II (Paperback), St. Martin's Griffin (November 13, 2000). , 
 Dan Muise, Rory Gallagher, Steve Marriott, and Rick Derringer, Gallagher, Marriott, Derringer, Trower: Their Lives and Music (Paperback - April 2002), Hal Leonard; 1 edition (April 2002). , 
 Yoko Ono, Memories of John Lennon (Hardcover), Harper Entertainment (November 29, 2005). , 
 Matt Gallagher, "Garland Jeffreys 'The King of In Between'", Mix Magazine (July 1, 2011).

External links
 Shelly Yakus Interview on Pro Sound's Website
 Bio on Lori Burton

1939 births
2014 deaths
Musicians from New Haven, Connecticut
Record producers from Connecticut
Record producers from New York (state)
American audio engineers
American expatriates in Brazil
American male songwriters
Engineers from Connecticut
Songwriters from New York (state)
Songwriters from Connecticut